"I'd Really Love to See You Tonight" is a song written by Parker McGee and recorded by England Dan & John Ford Coley from their 1976 album Nights Are Forever. It eventually peaked at No. 2 on the Billboard Hot 100 chart for two weeks, behind Wild Cherry's "Play That Funky Music" and No. 1 on the Easy Listening chart. Billboard ranked it as the No. 21 song for 1976. It also reached No. 26 on the UK Singles Chart.

Record World called it a "sparkling tune with its extraordinary melodic hook."

Dan Seals, the "England Dan" half of the duo, re-recorded the song in 1995 in an acoustic country music style for the album In a Quiet Room.

Chart history

Weekly charts

Year-end charts

All-time charts

Other cover versions
 Dee Dee Sharp Gamble covered the song on her 1977 album What Color Is Love.
 Reba McEntire and Jacky Ward covered the song in 1978 as part of a double-sided single with "Three Sheets in the Wind". Their version reached number 20 on the Billboard Hot Country Songs chart.
 Ian McShane covered the song on his 1992 album From Both Sides Now.
 Barry Manilow covered it on the 1996 album Summer of '78.
 Charlie McGettigan and Paul Harrington covered it on the album Rock 'n' Roll Kids.
 Lillo Thomas covered the song on this 2010 album Come and Get It.
The song appears in the Broadway musical Disaster!.

References

External links
 Lyrics of this song
 

1976 songs
1976 singles
Songs written by Parker McGee
Song recordings produced by Kyle Lehning
Big Tree Records singles
Atlantic Records singles